U-109 may refer to one of the following German submarines:

 , a Type U 93 submarine launched in 1917 that served in the First World War and sank in 1918
 During the First World War, Germany also had this submarine with a similar name:
 , a Type UB III submarine launched in 1917 and sank in 1918
 , a Type IXB submarine that served in the Second World War and sank in 1943

Submarines of Germany